The 1978–79 Hellenic Football League season was the 26th in the history of the Hellenic Football League, a football competition in England.  From this season the Hellenic League used again two points for a win.

Premier Division

The Premier Division featured twelve clubs which competed in the division last season, along with two new clubs, promoted from Division One:
Bicester Town
Garrard Athletic

League table

Division One

The Division One featured 14 clubs which competed in the division last season, along with 4 new clubs:
Thatcham Town, relegated from the Premier Division
Cirencester Town, relegated from the Premier Division
Northwood, joined from the Middlesex County Senior League
Rayners Lane

League table

References

External links
 Hellenic Football League

1978-79
8